The Grand Portage Indian Reservation (Ojibwe language: Gichi-onigamiing) is the Indian reservation of the Grand Portage Band of Minnesota Chippewa Tribe, a federally recognized tribe in Minnesota.

The reservation is in Cook County near the tip of Minnesota's Arrowhead Region in the extreme northeast part of the state. Historically, the community was considered part of the Lake Superior Band of Chippewa but is not a party to the treaties that group signed. The reservation was established as part of the 1854 Treaty of La Pointe. 

The unincorporated community of Grand Portage is located within the Grand Portage Indian Reservation.

Since 1934, Grand Portage has been one of the six bands of the Minnesota Chippewa Tribe, which wrote a constitution and initiated its new government in 1936. In the federal 2020 census, the reservation had a population of 618. The Minnesota Chippewa Tribe reported in July 2007 that Grand Portage had 1,127 people enrolled in the band.

Geography
The Grand Portage Band also had  of off-reservation trust land as of 2020.

Demographics
As of the census of 2020, the total population living on the reservation was 618. The racial makeup of the reservation was 63.1% Native American, 24.3% White, 0.8% Asian, 0.2% Black or African American, 0.2% Pacific Islander, and 11.5% from two or more races. Ethnically, the population was 1.8% Hispanic or Latino of any race.

Economy
The community operates a casino, the Grand Portage Lodge and Casino. The Grand Portage National Monument is located on the reservation and managed by the National Park Service. The site includes a reconstructed trading post which is authentic for the 18th century.

In 2000, Minnesota returned ownership of the  Grand Portage State Park to the Chippewa Band, which was lost more than 50 years ago in a tax forfeiture. In a unique arrangement in the state, this is the only state park to be managed jointly by the state and an American Indian band. The park includes a 120-foot high waterfall, which has been a landmark for centuries. The band employs its members as staff of the park.

Notable Grand Portage citizens
 George Morrison (1919–2000), painter, sculptor

See also
 Grand Portage National Monument
 Grand Portage, Minnesota – Unorganized Territory of Cook County
 Grand Portage (community), Minnesota – Unincorporated community located within both the reservation and unorganized territory
 Minnesota Indian Affairs Council

References

External links
Grand Portage Band of Lake Superior Chippewa
Grand Portage Lodge & Casino

American Indian reservations in Minnesota
Anishinaabe reservations and tribal-areas in the United States
Populated places in Cook County, Minnesota
Ojibwe in Minnesota
Native American tribes in Minnesota
Minnesota populated places on Lake Superior